The Moonmaids (sometimes styled as two words: Moon Maids) were an American female jazz and popular vocal quartet that started out as college student entertainers under the name "North Texas Swingtet."  As the Swingtet, they launched and performed with the Aces of Collegeland at the University of North Texas in 1943 and grew in popularity throughout the region.  Vaughn Monroe hired the group, renamed it "The Moonmaids," and debuted them with his orchestra on April 11, 1946, at Loews Theater in Washington, D.C.  The Moonmaids rapidly rose to national acclaim performing and recording with the Vaughn Monroe Orchestra for RCA Victor.  Within four months of joining Monroe, the Moonmaids were on the cover of Down Beat (August 26, 1946) and featured in Radio Mirror (January 1947)  With personnel changes now and then, the Moonmaids performed with Vaughn Monroe from 1946 to 1952.

Members

Selected discography 
Eddie South
 The Eddie South Trio with Vaughn Monroe and His Orchestra, AB Fable Records (E)ABCD1-009 (CD) (2005) 
 Trio: Hank Jones (piano), Eddie South (violin), Leonard Gaskin (bass)
 Orchestra: Frank L. Ryerson (trumpet, arranger-1), James Messina, Richard Lasala, Fred Taylor, Ed Shedowsky (trumpet-1) or Sal Gianetina (trumpet-1), Sam Hyster, Bill Mustard, Joseph Conigliaro, Joseph Bennett (trombone-1), Andy Bagni (né Andrew Joseph Bagni; 1907–1984), Phil Olivella (né Philip R. Olivella; 1918–1995) (alto sax-1) or Louis Feldman (alto sax-1), Ziggy Talent, John West (tenor sax-1) or Vito Marasco (tenor sax-1), Michael Shelby (piano-1), Bucky Pizzarelli (guitar-1), Maurice Ancher, Ed Bratone (né Edmund John Braghittoni; 1910–1981), Sam Caplan, Seymour Berman, Irving Raymond (violin-1), John Pastore (cello-1) or Eduardo Sodero (cello-1) Jack Fay (bass-1), Edward Julian (drums-1), Vaughn Monroe (vocal)
 Moonmaids: Kathryn Katie Myatt, Hilda Tinker Cunningham, Arlene Truax, Mary Joe Thomas, Mary Lee (vocals) — aka Mahree Ahm
 Recorded during The Vaughn Monroe Show, WCBS CBS, New York, January 11, 1947
 Daphne
 I Can't Believe That You're In Love With Me, Vaughn Monroe and His Orchestra, Moonmaids

Vaughn Monroe and The Moon Maids
 20-1920-A: "Just The Other Day" (audio clip), by Austem Croon-Johnson and Redd Evans
 20-1920-B: "When The Angelus Is Ringing" (audio clip), by Joe Young & Bert Grant, RCA Victor  (78 rpm) (1946) 

 20-1892-A: "Who Told You That Lie?" (audio clip), by Jack Segal, Eddie Cantor, and Bee Walker
 20-1892-B: "It's My Lazy Day," by Smiley Burnette, RCA Victor (78 rpm) (1946) 

 20–2294–A: "I Wish I Didn't Love You So," RCA Victor (78 rpm)
 20–2294–B: "Tallahassee"

 20–2361–A: "You Do," RCA Victor (78 rpm)
 20–2361–B: "Kokomo, Indiana"

 20–2523–A: "How Soon (Will I Be Seeing You)?" RCA Victor (78 rpm)
 20–2523–B: "True"

 20–2573–A: "Passing Fancy," RCA Victor (78 rpm)
 20–2671–B: "Someone Cares," RCA Victor (78 rpm) (1947)
 20–2712–B: "Completely Yours," RCA Victor 12S1 (78 rpm) (1947)
 20–2748–A: "It's The Sentimental Thing To Do," RCA Victor L-1S2-IV (78 rpm)
 20–2748–B: "Like We Used To Do," RCA Victor L-15S4-IV (78 rpm)

 20–2811–A: "What Do I Have To Do (To Make You Love Me)?" RCA Victor 8S (78 rpm) 
 20–2811–B: "A Little Imagination (It Only Takes)"

 20-3606-A: "So This Is Love" ("The Cinderella Waltz") (audio clip), lyrics by Mack David, Al Hoffman, and Jerry Livingston (1949)
 20-3606-B: "There's No One Here But Me," RCA Victor, DJ-816 (78 rpm) (1949) 

 20-3942-A: "A Marshmallow World" (audio clip), RCA Victor (78 rpm) (1950) 
 20-3942-B: "Snowy White Snow And Jingle Bells"

Filmography 
 Carnegie Hall (1947)
  Moonmaids with the Vaughn Monroe Orchestra in the film were Mary Jo Thomas, Tinker Cunningham, Arline Truax, Katie Myatt, and Maree Lee.

External links 
 Vaughn Monroe Society website

References 

Musical groups established in 1943
Musical groups disestablished in 1952
American vocal groups
Vocal quartets